Jesús Robinson Villalobos Bascuñán (born 17 March 1993), is a Chilean footballer who plays as defender for FK Utenis Utena.

Club career
Jesus debuts at UC in the national tournament play from the first minute to Cobresal.

External links
UC profile	

1993 births
Living people
Chilean footballers
Club Deportivo Universidad Católica footballers
Chilean people of Croatian descent
Association football defenders